Alkhaly Momo Cissé (born 17 October 2002) is a Guinean professional footballer who plays as a winger for I liga side Wisła Kraków, on loan from VfB Stuttgart.

Career
Cissé joined German club VfB Stuttgart in August 2020. He made his professional debut for the team in the Bundesliga on 19 September 2020, coming on as a substitute in the 78th minute for Roberto Massimo against SC Freiburg, which finished as a 3–2 home loss.

On 16 January 2022, he was loaned out to Polish Ekstraklasa club Wisła Kraków until the end of June 2023.

References

External links
 
 

2002 births
Living people
Sportspeople from Conakry
Guinean footballers
Guinean expatriate footballers
Guinean expatriate sportspeople in Germany
Guinean expatriate sportspeople in Poland
Expatriate footballers in Germany
Expatriate footballers in Poland
Association football wingers
Le Havre AC players
VfB Stuttgart players
Wisła Kraków players
Championnat National 2 players
Championnat National 3 players
Bundesliga players
Ekstraklasa players
I liga players